Countess of Lennox may refer to:

Margaret, Countess of Lennox (d. circa 1364)
Isabella, Countess of Lennox (d. 1458)
Margaret Douglas (1515–1578)
Elizabeth Stuart, Countess of Lennox (1555–1582)